Linda May Han Oh (born 25 August 1984) is an Australian jazz bassist and composer.

Biography 
Oh was raised in Western Australia. When she was 11, she started to play the clarinet and at the age of 13 bassoon. She went to Churchlands Senior High School. As a bass guitarist, she started in a high school band; and in 2002, she attended the Western Australian Academy of Performing Arts, where she picked up the upright bass and studied solo transcriptions of Dave Holland. Her thesis was on the classical Indian music rhythms in Holland's solos. After more scholarships she moved to New York in 2008, where she completed her master's degree at the Manhattan School of Music, among others with Jay Anderson, John Riley, Phil Markowitz, Dave Liebman and Rodney Jones as supervisors.

In 2008, she released her debut album Entry with own compositions and a cover version of Red Hot Chili Peppers Oztrax, with the trumpeter Ambrose Akinmusire and drummer Obed Calvaire. Oh also contributed to albums with the alto saxophonist Jon Irabagon (Outright, 2008), Sarah Bemanning (Løvetann Klokke, 2010), Brian Girley (Tro, 2011) and Art Hirahara (Hygget & Meditasjoner, 2014). In 2012, the album Initial Here, med pianist, Fabian Almazan was released, followed by Sun Pictures (Greenleaf), among others with Ted Poor. In addition, she has performed with Slide Hampton, T. S. Monk, Nathan Davis, George Kabler, James Morrison, Nasheet Venter, Joel Frahm, Pat Metheny, Steve Wilson and Billy Childs. She lives in the Harlem district in New York City. She is married to Cuban American pianist Fabian Almazan since 2018.

Awards and honors
 2004: Winner of the competition IAJE Sisters in Jazz
 First prize for best presentation at her exam. 
 2006-2008 she was a scholarship holder of the program Betty Carter ' s Jazz Ahead, Banff center, program for creative improvisation, and Steans Institut. 
 2008: Participant of ASCAP Young Jazz Composer’s Award 
 2009: Semifinalist of the Thelonious Monk International Jazz Bass Competition. 
 2010: Winner of the Bell-Prize for young Australian jazz musicians of the year.
 2023: Winner of the 'Best jazz instrumental album' at the Grammys alongside Terri Lyne Carrington, Kris Davis, Nicholas Payton & Matthew Stevens for New Standards Vol. 1

Discography

As leader
 Entry (Self Released, 2009)
 Initial Here (Greenleaf Music, 2012)
 Sun Pictures (Greenleaf Music, 2013)
 Walk Against Wind (Biophilia, 2017)
 Aventurine (Biophilia, 2019)

As guest
With Dave Douglas
 GPS Vol 2: Orange Afternoons (Greenleaf Music, 2011)
 Be Still (Greenleaf Music, 2012)
 Pathways (Greenleaf Music, 2013)
 Time Travel (Greenleaf Music, 2013)
 Brazen Heart (Greenleaf Music, 2015)
 Serial Sessions 2015 (Greenleaf Music, 2016)
 Brazen Heart: Live at Jazz Standard (Greenleaf Music, 2018)
Songs Of Ascent: Book 1 - Degrees (Greenleaf Music, 2022) 

With Art Hirahara
 Libations & Meditations (Posi-Tone, 2015)
 Central Line (Posi-Tone, 2017)
 Sunward Bound (Posi-Tone, 2018)

With Jim Snidero
 Stream of Consciousness (Savant, 2013)
 Main Street (Savant, 2015)
 Project-K (Savant, 2020)

With others
 Fabian Almazan, Personalities (Biophilia, 2011)
 Fabian Almazan, This Land Abounds with Life (Biophilia, 2019)
 Quentin Angus, Perception (Aurora Sounds, 2013)
 Thomas Barber, Snow Road (D Clef, 2009)
 David Berkman, Old Friends and New Friends (Palmetto, 2015)
 Anthony Branker, Beauty Within (Origin, 2016)
 Terri Lyne Carrington, The Mosaic Project: Love and Soul (Concord, 2015)
 George Colligan, Ask Me Tomorrow (SteepleChase, 2014)
 George Colligan, More Powerful (Whirlwind, 2017)
 Angela Davis, The Art of the Melody (Nicholas, 2013)
 Michael Dease, Relentless (Posi-Tone, 2014)
 Joe Lovano & Dave Douglas, Sound Prints (Blue Note, 2015)
 Joe Lovano & Dave Douglas, Scandal (Greenleaf Music, 2018)
 Pat Metheny, From This Place (Nonesuch, 2020)
 Tineke Postma, Sonic Halo (Challenge, 2014)
 Kavita Shah, Visions (Naive, 2014)
 Florian Weber, Lucent Waters (ECM, 2018)
 Vijay Iyer, Uneasy (ECM, 2021)
 Victor Wooten & Steve Bailey, S'Low Down (Vix, 2022)

References

External links 
 
 
 TheAustralian.com.au

People from Western Australia
Australian bass guitarists
1984 births
Jazz bass guitarists
Australian jazz composers
Musicians from New York City
Living people
21st-century bass guitarists
Grammy Award winners